Paul Richard Holvey (born January 11, 1954) is an American politician. He is a Democratic member of the Oregon House of Representatives, representing District 8 since his appointment in January 2004, and serves as the Speaker pro tempore.

Early career and education
Holvey began his career as an apprentice in the carpentry industry, which led him into later becoming a journeyman in the carpenters union. As a carpenter, foreman, and project superintendent, Holvey has worked in Oregon, Washington, California and Alaska.  Holvey attended Lane Community College and Central Washington University, and received a certificate from the University of Oregon's Labor Education and Research Center.

Oregon House
Holvey was appointed to the Oregon House of Representatives in January 2004, to replace Floyd Prozanski, who had resigned to accept an appointment to a seat in the state Senate.  He was elected to the seat in November 2004.

Family
Holvey and his wife Terrie reside in south Eugene along with their three Yorkshire Terriers. He also has a son, Justin, and daughter in-law, Carla.

References

External links
Campaign website
Legislative website
Project Vote Smart - Representative Paul R. Holvey (OR) profile
Follow the Money - Paul R Holvey
2006 2004 campaign contributions

|-

1954 births
21st-century American politicians
Central Washington University alumni
Lane Community College alumni
Living people
Speakers of the Oregon House of Representatives
Democratic Party members of the Oregon House of Representatives